Cecil William Weekes (1931–2012) was Dean of Lismore from 1990   until 1996.

He was the Non-Stipendiary Minister at Glenageary from 1978 to 1980 and Bishop's Vicar at Kilkenny Cathedral from then until 1983.  He was the incumbent at Carlow from 1983 until 1990.

References

1931 births
Deans of Lismore
2012 deaths